Raised on Rock / For Ol' Times Sake is the nineteenth studio album by American singer and musician Elvis Presley, released in 1973.

Content
The album was recorded at Stax Studios in Memphis, Tennessee in July 1973 and at Presley's home in Palm Springs, California in September 1973. Two songs from these sessions would be retained for release on the Good Times album the following spring. The initial vocal tracks were recorded in July 1973. "Raised on Rock" backed by "For Ol' Times Sake" was the only single released from the album, reaching No. 41 on the Billboard chart and No. 42 on the Country chart in September 1973.

The album was one of the few that failed to chart in the United Kingdom, but the single "Raised on Rock / For Ol' Times Sake" did enter the British charts. Some of the songs are well-known covers like "Are You Sincere" which had been around for many years, but some new songs like the lead-off single were written for Presley, or written by writers he had previously recorded, such as Mark James. The title single, "Raised on Rock" has been noted by historians such as Roy Carr and Mick Farren in Elvis: The Illustrated Record as odd lyrically, as Presley sings in first person about being a child and discovering rock and roll through records such as "Johnny B. Goode" when Presley was a contemporary of the artists he cites.

In 1979, a stripped-down version of "Are You Sincere" was included on the album Our Memories of Elvis and released as a single, reaching No. 10 on the Billboard Country chart.

Reissues
In 2007 Raised on Rock was reissued on the Follow That Dream label in a special 2-disc edition that contained the original album tracks along with numerous alternate takes.

Track listing

Original release

2007 Follow That Dream reissue

Personnel

Elvis Presley – lead vocals
James Burton – lead guitar
Bobby Manuel – lead guitar on "Girl of Mine" and "Sweet Angeline"
Charlie Hodge – rhythm guitar
 Reggie Young – guitar on "If You Don't Come Back", "Find Out What's Happening", "Just a Little Bit" and "Three Corn Patches"
Johnny Christopher – guitar on "Raised on Rock", "For Ol’ Times Sake", "Girl of Mine" and "Sweet Angeline"
 Dennis Linde – guitar on "Girl of Mine"
Bobby Wood – piano except "Are You Sincere" and "I Miss You"
Donnie Sumner – piano on "Are You Sincere" and "I Miss You"
Tommy Cogbill – bass guitar
Donald Dunn — bass guitar on "Girl of Mine" and "Sweet Angeline"
Tom Hensley – bass guitar on "Are You Sincere" and "I Miss You"
Bobby Emmons – Hammond organ
Ron Tutt – drums (except "Are You Sincere", "I Miss You", "Girl of Mine" and "Sweet Angeline")
 Jerry Carrigan – drums except "Are You Sincere" and "I Miss You"
 Al Jackson Jr. — drums on "Girl of Mine"
Glen Spreen – string arrangements
Mary and Ginger Holliday – backing vocals
Kathy Westmoreland – backing vocals
J. D. Sumner and the Stamps – backing vocals

References

External links

Elvis Presley albums
Albums produced by Felton Jarvis
1973 albums
RCA Records albums